Portel is a municipality in the District of Évora in Portugal. The population in 2011 was 6,428, in an area of 601.01 km2.

The present Mayor is Norberto António Lopes Patinho, elected by the Socialist Party. The municipal holiday is Easter Monday.

Parishes
Administratively, the municipality is divided into 6 civil parishes (freguesias):
 Amieira e Alqueva
 Monte do Trigo
 Portel
 Santana
 São Bartolomeu do Outeiro e Oriola
 Vera Cruz

Gallery

Notable people 
 Luís Zambujo (born 1986) a Portuguese former professional footballer with 311 club caps

References

External links
Town Hall official website
Photos from Portel
Portel website

Municipalities of Évora District